Streptomyces acidicola is a bacterium species from the genus Streptomyces which has been isolated from soil from the Kantulee peat swamp forest from the Surat Thani province in Thailand.

See also 
 List of Streptomyces species

References 

acidicola
Bacteria described in 2020